The Women's 53 kg event at the 2010 South American Games was held over March 26 at 18:00.

Medalists

Results

References
Final

53kg W